Horn to Horn is an album by saxophonists Teddy Edwards and Houston Person which was recorded in 1994 and first released on the Muse label in 1996.

Reception

In his review on Allmusic, Scott Yanow notes that "This is a logical and very successful collaboration featuring the East Coast tenor Houston Person and L.A.'s legendary Teddy Edwards. Although one can generally tell the two veterans apart (Person has a heavier sound than the comparatively light-toned Edwards), the co-leaders are quite complementary and work together well in the tradition of Sonny Stitt and Gene Ammons ... Edwards and Person pay tribute to eight great tenors of the past (John Coltrane, Ben Webster, Lester Young, Stan Getz, Coleman Hawkins, Gene Ammons, Dexter Gordon, and Eddie "Lockjaw" Davis) through their renditions of eight standards ... Recommended"

Track listing 
 "Equinox" (John Coltrane) – 7:57
 "That's All" (Bob Haymes, Alan Brandt) – 6:28	
 "Lester Leaps In" (Lester Young) – 5:18
 "The Girl from Ipanema" (Antônio Carlos Jobim, Vinícius de Moraes, Norman Gimbel) – 6:58	
 "Body and Soul" (Johnny Green, Frank Eyton, Edward Heyman, Robert Sour) – 7:20
 "Red Top" (Woody Herman) – 7:42	
 "Talk of the Town" (Jerry Livingston, Al J. Neiburg, Marty Symes) – 6:57
 "Out of Nowhere" (Green, Edward Heyman) – 7:47

Personnel 
Teddy Edwards, Houston Person – tenor saxophone
Richard Wyands – piano
Peter Washington – bass
Kenny Washington – drums

References 

Teddy Edwards albums
Houston Person albums
1996 albums
Muse Records albums
Albums recorded at Van Gelder Studio